Jerry Tucker may refer to:

 Jerry Tucker (actor) (1925–2016), American child actor
 Jerry Tucker (labor leader) (died 2012), American workers' rights activist and educator